You Made Me Realise is the third extended play by alternative rock band My Bloody Valentine, released on 8 August 1988 through Creation Records. It was their first record for Creation.

Sound and influences 
The EP marked a change in direction for the band, where they adopted a noisier sound. Peter Kember, then of Spacemen 3, recalled seeing the band play "You Made Me Realise" at a live performance at the Roadmender in Northampton in 1988, after My Bloody Valentine had supported the Pixies on the latter's first European tour: "They’d transformed. I don’t know quite what had happened, but sometimes bands hit a certain quantum shift. The noise was overwhelming". In a 2013 interview, Kevin Shields acknowledged the influence of Sonic Youth's Thurston Moore and Dinosaur Jr.'s J Mascis on his guitar playing at the time, but also highlighted a change in how he used reverse reverb. He had used this effect on the band's previous releases "Strawberry Wine" and Ecstasy, but "to no great consequence, because I was using it the way it was meant to be used. Then in '88, I discovered that it was extremely sensitive to velocity and how high you hit the string. You could make huge waves of sound by hitting it softer or harder". He also credited starting to smoke cannabis, which he had done for six months by the time of recording the EP, as an influence.

Release 

Both the single and EP versions were released on 8 August 1988. The single version was limited to 1,000 copies. According to Miki Berenyi from Lush, the girl featured in the album cover is Melanie, who was likely a friend of these bands at the time. The Mercury Records version of the EP was released in November 1988 and added the tracks from its successor EP, Feed Me with Your Kiss.

The promotional video was directed by ex-Jesus and Mary Chain bassist Douglas Hart.

Reception 

The You Made Me Realise EP has been very well-received critically.

Spin magazine called the record "astonishing". AllMusic wrote that the EP "made critics stand up and take notice of the brilliant things My Bloody Valentine were up to; it developed some of the stunning guitar sounds that would become the band's trademark, and features tracks which are just as innovative."

In 2005, Stylus Magazine ranked the title song's bassline at number 24 in their list of the "Top 50 Basslines of All Time".

Live performances 

During live performances the band repeats a single chord from the song for as long as they felt bearable, the song descending into cacophony, usually lasting around 15 minutes, although there are reports of shows where it went on for well over half an hour. For the 2008–09 reunion shows, "You Made Me Realise" brought each show to an ear-splitting conclusion, reaching up to 130 dB.

From the 2014 documentary Beautiful Noise, Billy Corgan, on the long noise section played live, said:

It's one of those things where, it was full volume
and for the first three minutes it's like "oh okay this is kind of cool". 
Then you're like "This is really too much. I wish they'd fucking stop".
And then at about 7 minutes it actually became kind of funny.
And about 10 minutes in you start actually getting into it.

and Colm Ó Cíosóig interpreted audience reaction as:
We hate you. But we have to keep on watching you. Because we can't believe what you're doing, that you're bringing this torture upon us!

Track listing

Personnel 

All personnel credits adapted from the EP's liner notes.

 My Bloody Valentine

Kevin Shields – vocals, guitar, production
Bilinda Butcher – vocals, guitar, production
Debbie Googe – bass guitar, production
Colm Ó Cíosóig – drums, production

Chart positions

Accolades

References

External links 

 
 

My Bloody Valentine (band) EPs
1988 singles
1988 EPs
My Bloody Valentine (band) songs
Creation Records EPs
Songs written by Kevin Shields